The Fort of the Maré, ruins of a 16th-century fortification located in the civil parish São Mateus da Calheta, in the municipality of Angra do Heroísmo, along the southern coast of Terceira, Portuguese archipelago of the Azores.

History
Its construction remotes from the Portuguese succession crisis of 1580, sometime between 1579 and 1581, when attacks by pirates in the mid-Atlantic threatened the safety and security of New World treasure ships. The Corregedor of the Azores, Ciprião de Figueiredo e Vasconcelos initiated the construction of several forts that ringed the coasts of Terceira, using the plans of Italian military engineer Tommaso Benedetto as its basis.

Architecture
The fortification dominated the coastal stretch of São Mateus.

By the end of the 20th century there little more than ruins of this fortification, and the remains of its foundations.

References

Notes

Sources
 

Fort Mare
Mare